Windows on the World is a 2019 American drama film directed by Michael D. Olmos and starring Ryan Guzman and Edward James Olmos.  The title of the film refers to the namesake restaurant that used to exist in the top floors of the North Tower of the World Trade Center until it was destroyed in the September 11 attacks.

Plot
Following the collapse of the World Trade Center towers, Fernando, a young Mexican man, journeys to New York City in search of his father, an undocumented busboy at Windows on the World, who has disappeared in the disaster, yet may be alive. Fernando's adventures along the way, finding love and friendship, give him faith in humanity while teaching hard lessons.

Cast
Ryan Guzman as Fernando
René Auberjonois as Maury
Edward James Olmos as Balthazar
Julie Carmen as Elena
Jacqueline Obradors as Margot
Richard Cabral as Domingo
Glynn Turman as Lou
Stephen Spinella as Albert
Anna Sophia Mota Arellano as Esmeralda

Production
Principal photography began on July 10, 2017.

Release
The film made its worldwide premiere on March 3, 2019 at the Sedona Film Festival.

References

External links
 

American drama films
Films based on the September 11 attacks
2010s English-language films
2010s American films